A visitor center or centre (see American and British English spelling differences), visitor information center, tourist information center, is a physical location that provides tourist information to visitors.

Types of visitor center

A visitor center may be:

 A visitor center at a specific attraction or place of interest, such as a landmark, national park, national forest, or state park, providing information (such as trail maps, and about camp sites, staff contact, restrooms, etc.) and in-depth educational exhibits and artifact displays (for example, about natural or cultural history). Often a film or other media display is used. If the site has permit requirements or guided tours, the visitor center is often the place where these are coordinated.
 A tourist information center, providing visitors to a location with information on the area's attractions, lodgings, maps, and other items relevant to tourism. Often, these centers are operated at the airport or other port of entry, by the local government or chamber of commerce. Often a visitor center is called simply an information center.
 A corporate visitor center, provides visitors with an easily accessible window into the corporation.
 A Temple Visitors Center is a type of visitors center specific to the Church of Jesus Christ of Latter-day Saints that provides information about the adjacent Temple and the doctrines of the Church. The Visitors Center may also include a Family History Center and a theater for films, musical performances and religious devotionals.

Visitor centers used to provide fairly basic information about the place, corporation or event they are celebrating, acting more as the entry way to a place. The role of the visitor center has been rapidly evolving over the past 10 years to become more of an experience and to tell the story of the place or brand it represents. Many have become destinations and experiences in their own right.

Europe

United Kingdom
In the United Kingdom, there is a nationwide network of Tourist Information Centres run by the British Tourist Authority (BTA), represented online by the VisitBritain website and public relations organisation. Other TICs are run by local authorities or through private organisations such as local shops in association with BTA.

In England, VisitEngland promotes domestic tourism.

In Wales, the Welsh Government supports TICs through Visit Wales.

In Scotland, the Scottish Government supports VisitScotland, the official tourist organisation of Scotland, which also operates Tourist Information Centres across Scotland.

Poland
In Poland there are special offices and tables giving free information about tourist attractions. Offices are situated in interesting places in popular tourists' destinations and tables usually stay near monuments and important culture

North America

In North America, a welcome center is a rest area with a visitor center, located after the entrance from one state or province to another state or province or in some cases another country, usually along an Interstate Highway or other freeway. These information centers are operated by the state they are located in. The first example opened on 4 May 1935, next to US 12 in New Buffalo, Michigan, near the Indiana state line.

Many United States cities, such as Houston, Texas and Boca Raton, Florida, as well as counties and other areas smaller than states, also operate welcome centers, though usually with less facilities than state centers have.

In Ontario, there are 11 Ontario Travel Information Centres located along 400-series highways.

South America

Peru

Peru features Iperú, Tourist Information and Assistance, a free service that provides tourist information for domestic and foreign travelers, the information covers destinations, attractions, recommended routes and licensed tourism companies in Peru. It also provides assistance on various procedures or where tourists have problems of various kinds. Iperú receives complaints and suggestions for destinations and tourism companies operating in Peru (lodging, travel agencies, airlines, buses, etc.).

Iperú, Tourist Information and Assistance has a nationwide network represented online by the Peru.travel website, the 24/7 line (51 1) 5748000, and 31 local offices in 13 regions in all over Peru: Lima-Callao, Amazonas, Piura, Lambayeque, La Libertad, Ancash, Arequipa, Tacna, Puno, Ayacucho, Cusco, Tumbes and Iquitos.

The official tourist organization or national tourist board of Peru is PromPerú, a national organization that promotes both tourism and international commerce of this country worldwide.

Oceania
In Australia, most visitor centres are local or state government-run, or in some cases as an association of tourism operators on behalf of the government, usually managed by a board or executive. Those that comply with a national accreditation programme use the italic "i" as pictured above. These visitor information centres (often abbreviated as VICs) provide information on the local area, and usually perform services such as accommodation and tour bookings, flight/bus/train/hire car options, and act as the first point of contact a visitor has with the town or region.

See also
Heritage center
Heritage interpretation
Interpretation center
Nature center
United States Capitol Visitor Center

References

External links

 Communicating effectively with visitors – 16 tips for visitor centers

 
Tourism agencies